Derrick Lamont Coleman (born October 18, 1990) is a former American football fullback. He was signed as an undrafted free agent by the Minnesota Vikings in 2012. He played college football for the University of California, Los Angeles (UCLA). Coleman is the first legally deaf offensive player in the NFL.

Early life
Coleman became deaf when he was three years old. He attended Troy High School in Fullerton, California, and played college football for UCLA.

Professional career

Minnesota Vikings
Coleman went undrafted, then signed as an undrafted free agent with the Minnesota Vikings on April 28, 2012. He was waived by the Vikings in August.

Seattle Seahawks
Coleman was signed by the Seattle Seahawks in December 2012. He made the 2013 season cut after the fourth preseason game and thus was added to the 53-man roster. In week one's game between the Seahawks and the Carolina Panthers, Coleman had three catches for 30 yards. Coleman scored his first NFL touchdown on December 2, 2013, on Monday Night Football against the New Orleans Saints off of a ricocheted ball from Kellen Davis. Coleman was a part of the Seahawks Super Bowl XLVIII championship team. On October 15, 2015, Coleman was suspended indefinitely after an arrest on hit-and-run charges, but the suspension was lifted on October 19, after a team investigation.

Atlanta Falcons
On March 21, 2017, Coleman signed with the Atlanta Falcons. On September 10, he made his Falcons debut in the 23–17 victory over the Chicago Bears.

Arizona Cardinals
On May 9, 2018, Coleman signed with the Arizona Cardinals.

On November 19, 2020, the Las Vegas Raiders hosted Coleman for a workout.

Personal life
In January 2014, Coleman was featured in a widely praised commercial for Duracell batteries. The commercial inspired twin sisters Riley and Erin Kovalcik, who also wear hearing aids, to write him a letter of support. After exchanging letters, Coleman and Duracell decided to invite the Kovalcik family to watch the Super Bowl XLVIII in person on February 2, 2014.

Coleman is a Christian and has spoken about his faith, saying, "I always say that God blessed me this morning and I can do what I do."

Legal incidents
On October 15, 2015, Coleman was reportedly driving his Dodge Ram erratically in Bellevue, Washington. After accelerating to over 60 mph, he slammed into the back of another vehicle, injuring 56-year old driver Kristopher Fine. It is alleged that Coleman fled the scene of the accident on foot but was spotted and detained by police within 10 minutes. Police reported that Coleman claimed to have smoked spice, a synthetic form of marijuana, about an hour prior to the incident. On October 6, 2016, he pled guilty to vehicular assault and hit-and-run charges. On October 15, 2016, he was ordered to carry out 240 hours of community service and was required to be under community supervision for 12 months. Under the agreement, he was also required to pay the victim restitution and property damages. After being sentenced, Coleman was notified that should he sign with a team in the NFL, he would be required to serve a four-game suspension, which indeed later commenced on October 14, 2016.

References

External links
 UCLA Bruins bio

1990 births
Living people
American football fullbacks
Arizona Cardinals players
Atlanta Falcons players
American deaf people
Deaf players of American football
Minnesota Vikings players
Seattle Seahawks players
Sportspeople from Fullerton, California
UCLA Bruins football players